Patricia Glass Schuman (born 1943) is an American librarian and publisher who served as president of the American Library Association from 1991 to 1992. She is a graduate of the University of Cincinnati and the Columbia University School of Library Service.

In 1976, Schuman founded Neal-Schuman Publishers with John Vincent Neal.  The company specialized in education resources for librarians, educators and information professionals. The company became part of ALA Publishing in 2011.

As President of the American Library Association, Schuman launched a nationwide campaign to focus attention on the public's right to know including censorship and access to government information.  She implemented media training for association leaders, established a speaker’s network, and founded the Library Advocacy Now! effort. She also served the association as its first woman treasurer and led efforts to endow a scholarship fund.  Schuman was a founding member of the ALA’s Social Responsibilities Roundtable and the Feminist Task Force. In 2014 she was named an Honorary Member of the association.

Publications
 "Your Right to Know: The Call to Action" (American Library Association, 1992)  
 "Materials for occupational education: An annotated source guide" (R. R. Bowker, 1971)  
 "Library and information services for meeting personal needs: a discussion guide" (National Commission on Libraries and Information Science, 1979)
Social Responsibilities and Libraries (R.R. Bowker, 1976)

References

 

1943 births
Living people
American librarians
American women librarians
Presidents of the American Library Association
University of Cincinnati alumni
Columbia University School of Library Service alumni
21st-century American women